Chadstone is a hamlet in the civil parish of Castle Ashby, West Northamptonshire.

Hamlets in Northamptonshire
West Northamptonshire District